Carlos Iniesta Mira (born 4 November 1966) is a Spanish windsurfer. He competed in the Division II event at the 1988 Summer Olympics.

Notes

References

External links
 
 
 
 

1966 births
Living people
Sportspeople from Alicante
Spanish windsurfers
Olympic sailors of Spain
Sailors at the 1988 Summer Olympics – Division II
Spanish male sailors (sport)